Trull House is a Grade II listed country house near the hamlet of Trull, to the north of the village of Ashley and about  northeast of Tetbury in Gloucestershire, England.

The seven-bedroom house, built in 1843, was once owned by Cooper Trull Ian Norman Mitchell, High Sheriff of Gloucestershire for 1969–70.

References

Country houses in Gloucestershire
Grade II listed houses
Grade II listed buildings in Gloucestershire
Houses completed in 1843
1843 establishments in England